1993 in Armenian football was the second season of independent football after the split-up from the Soviet Union. Professional football existed of two divisions, the Armenian Premier League (containing 16 teams) and the Armenian First League (2 groups of 14). Out of the 16 Premier League teams, three would relegate, while the two First League group winners along with the better runner-up would promote for the 1994 season.

Premier League
 FC Ararat (from the town of Ararat) were promoted and changed their name to Tsement Ararat.
 Before the start of the season Syunik Kapan withdrew from competition.
 Kilikia F.C. merged with FC Malatia to form Malatia-Kilikia Yerevan (only for a single season).
 Nairi SC were renamed Nairit.
 Shengavit FC gave its license in the premier league to Yerazank FC.

League table

Top goalscorers

First League
 FC Zangezour (from Goris), FC Sipan (from Artik),  and FIMA Yerevan are promoted from the Armenian Second league.
 Before the start of the season Debed FC, FC Nig Aparan, FC Geghard, FC Sipan, and Alashkert Martuni withdrew from the competition.
 FC Malatia merged with Kilikia F.C. to form Malatia-Kilikia Yerevan.
 Zoravan Yeghvard changed their name to FC Yeghvard.
 Urmia Masis changed their name to Masis.
 FC Vanadzor changed their name to Avtogen Vanadzor.
 Kaen Ijevan Changed their name to SKA Injevan.
 FC Moush Charentsavan, SKA Ijevan, FC Almast and RUOR Yerevan were disqualified at the end of the season. However, their existing records are not available.

League table, Group 1

League table, Group 2

Top goalscorers

Armenia Cup

External links
 RSSSF: Armenia 1993